Max (9 August 1983 – 18 May 2013) was a beagle, dachshund and terrier mix whose owner claimed that he had lived 29 years and 282 days.  His owner, Janelle Derouen, adopted him from a Louisiana sugar cane farmer in 1983.

In August 2009, The Telegraph reported that Max had veterinary records proving his age and that at 29 he was the world's oldest living dog. He was 3 years older than Pusuke, a Shiba Inu who, at 26 years of age, had previously been considered the oldest living dog.

On May 15, 2013, the Guinness World Records organization was purported to have approved a claim made by Janelle DeRouen for Max to be recognized as the World's Oldest Dog.  However, just three days later, on May 18, Max died of a tonic–clonic seizure.

See also
List of longest living dogs
List of individual dogs

References

External links
 ABC News video - Old Bones: The World's Oldest Dog

1983 animal births
2013 animal deaths
Individual dogs in the United States